Finnur Jónsson (May 29, 1858 – March 30, 1934) was an Icelandic-Danish philologist and Professor of Nordic Philology at the University of Copenhagen. He made extensive contributions to the study of Old Norse literature.

Finnur Jónsson was born at Akureyri in northern Iceland. He graduated from Menntaskólinn í Reykjavík in 1878 and went to Denmark for further studies at the University of Copenhagen. He received a doctorate in philology in 1884 with a dissertation on skaldic poetry. He became a docent at the university in 1887 and a professor in 1898, serving until 1928. After retiring he continued work on his subject with new publications until the year he died.

He was elected member of the Royal Society of Arts and Sciences in Gothenburg in 1905 and corresponding member of the Royal Swedish Academy of Letters, History and Antiquities in 1908.

Finnur's principal area of study was Old Norse poetry. His three most important works are Den norsk-islandske skjaldedigtning, an edition of the entire corpus of skaldic poetry in two parts – one which gives the text of the manuscripts with variants and one which gives a normalized text and a Danish translation. Another of Finnur's major works is Lexicon Poeticum, a dictionary of Old Norse poetry, ostensibly an update of a work with the same name by Sveinbjörn Egilsson but in effect an original work. The third principal work is Den oldnorske og oldislandske litteraturs historie, a detailed history of Old Norse literature.

Finnur was an unusually prolific scholar, preparing editions of, among other works, numerous Icelanders' sagas, Kings' sagas, Rímur (along with a dictionary of rímur) and the Eddas. A skilled polemicist, he defended his belief in the historical accuracy of the sagas and the antiquity of the Eddic poems in debates with other scholars.

References

Other sources
Jón Helgason (1934). "Mindeord om Finnur Jónsson" in Aarbøger for nordisk Oldkyndighed og Historie, 1934, pp. 137–60.

External links
Det gamle Grønlands beskrivelse af  Ívar Bárðarson (Ivar Bårdssön)  (translated by  Finnur Jónsson. published by Levin & Munksgaard Forlag. 1930) 
Den norsk-islandske skjaldedigtning (translated by  Finnur Jónsson. published by Gyldendal, Nordisk forlag 1912–1915)
Old Norse editions List includes several works by Finnur Jónsson
Lexicon Poeticum A partial online edition
Den norsk-islandske skjaldedigtning A partial online edition

Finnur Jonsson
Finnur Jonsson
19th-century Danish philologists
20th-century Danish philologists
Danish translators
Danish scholars
Finnur Jonsson
Finnur Jonsson
Finnur Jonsson
Finnur Jonsson
Finnur Jonsson
Old Norse studies scholars
Members of the Royal Society of Sciences and Letters in Gothenburg
Members of the Royal Swedish Academy of Letters, History and Antiquities
Corresponding Fellows of the British Academy
Finnur Jonsson